The Star  of Star Newspapers was a twice weekly regional newspaper serving the southern Chicago suburbs. The newspaper covered news in Chicago Heights, Park Forest, Crete, University Park, Orland Park, Tinley Park, Oak Forest, Matteson, Richton Park, Frankfort, Mokena, and New Lenox, among a handful of other southern suburbs.

On November 18, 2007, The Star was merged into The Daily Southtown to become the SouthtownStar. The paper is delivered daily to subscribers, with a special Neighborhood Star pull-out section included in the Thursday and Sunday editions.

Generally, its circulation area extends from the Illinois-Indiana state line on the east to New Lenox on the west. Its coverage area goes as far north as Worth Township and as far south as Beecher. The SouthtownStar is owned by the Sun-Times Media Group. Then in 2014, the SouthtownStar was purchased by the Chicago Tribune.

External links
The Neighborhood Star website 
Profile at Mondotimes

Defunct newspapers published in Illinois